Paralympic shooting at the 2018 Asian Para Games was held in Jakarta between 8 and 12 October 2018.

Medal table

Medalists

Men

Women

Mixed

See also
Shooting at the 2018 Asian Games

References

External links
 Shooting Para Sport - Asian Para Games 2018
 RESULT SYSTEM - ASIAN PARA GAMES JAKARTA 2018

2018 Asian Para Games events